Chlef District is a district of Chlef Province, Algeria.

Communes 
The district is further divided into 3 communes:
 Chlef
  Sendjas 
  Oum Drou

References 

Districts of Chlef Province